Mist in the Valley is a 1923 British silent crime film directed by Cecil Hepworth and starring Alma Taylor, G. H. Mulcaster and James Carew. It was based on a novel by Dorin Craig.

Cast
 Alma Taylor - Margaret Yeoland 
 G. H. Mulcaster - Denis Marlow 
 James Carew - Justin Courtney 
 Esme Hubbard - Nurse Merrion 
 John MacAndrews - Job Pennyquick 
 Gwynne Herbert - Mrs. Grick 
 Maud Cressall - Mother Superior 
 Charles Vane - Squire Yeoland 
 Douglas Munro - Prosecution 
 Lionel d'Aragon - Defence 
 Bertram Terry - Mr. Moon 
 Fred Rains - Mr. Warren

References

External links

1923 films
1923 crime films
1920s English-language films
Films directed by Cecil Hepworth
British silent feature films
Hepworth Pictures films
British black-and-white films
British crime films
1920s British films